Emmerting is a municipality in the district of Altötting in Bavaria in Germany and member of the administrative association of the same name.

Geography

Geographical Location 
Emmerting is located in the southeast of Upper Bavaria.

Structure of the municipality 
Emmerting is divided into four parts: 
 Bruck
 Oberemmerting
 Seng
 Unteremmerting

There are also the subdistricts Altöttinger Forst, Alzgerner Forst, Emmerting and Holzfelder Forst.

History

Until the municipality foundation 
Emmerting was first documented in 815 as Ehemutingen in a barter agreement of the Bishop of Salzburg. Emmerting belonged to the  Burghausen and to the regional court Neuötting of the Electorate of Bavaria. In the course of administrative reform in Bavaria, today's municipality came with the municipality edict of 1818

19th and 20th century 
The place is listed on cards in the 19th to the 20th century as Egmating.

In 1960 Emmerting became its own parish. As part of the Territorial Reform Emmerting and Mehring merged in 1978 to form an administrative community.

Spin-Off 
In 1955 the spin-off of the district Gendorf with its industrial park to Burgkirchen an der Alz took place.

Population Development

Politics

Mayor 
Mayor is Stefan Kammergruber (CSU). He was elected at the local election in 2014, and was re-elected in 2020.

Parish Council 
The council has 16 members.
The past municipal elections on March 16, 2014 and March 3, 2008 produced the following result:

Another member and chairman of the parish council is the mayor.

Culture and Sights 
The Catholic parish church Hl. Geist is a modern cubic building with a freestanding tower.

It was built from 1965 to 1967 according to plans by architect Karl Habermann and has the equipment of Wolf Hirtreiter.

Economy and Infrastructure

Economy 
In 2014, according to official statistics, there were 101 employees in the manufacturing industry and 44 in the area of trade, transport and hospitality industry. In other sectors of the economy, 144 persons were employed by the social insurance system at the place of work. There were a total of 1712 employees subject to social insurance at the place of residence. There were no businesses in the manufacturing sector and three companies in the construction industry. In addition, in 2010 there were seven farms with a total agricultural area of 142 ha, of which 89 ha were arable land and 53 ha were permanent green areas.

Local Supply 
The local supply in Emmerting is well divided. In 1991, Jürgen Pfeiffer opened a Spar supermarket in the center of Emmerting. It was centrally located and easy to get to. In 2004, the Spar supermarket was re-flagged in Edeka. In 1996 a retail park opened in the Guglweiterstrasse. Among other things, it housed a penny market, a Fristo beverage market, as well as a butcher and a baker. In 2008, a new building was created for the penny market, which was again completely renovated in 2013. In the old shop area now a pet food store is located.

Education 
There are the following institutions (state: 2015):
 Kindergartens: two institutions, 150 kindergarten places with 130 children
 Elementary school: one with 14 teachers and 228 students

Since due to small numbers of students the required minimum number for the formation of a school class was not reached, the elementary school Emmerting-Mehring was dissolved in 2009 and distributed the main students to the surrounding secondary schools Burghausen and Burgkirchen. The elementary school Emmerting remained.

References

External links 

 Homepage der Gemeinde